Zaprutye is a rural locality in Kosteltsevsky Selsoviet Rural Settlement, Kurchatovsky District, Kursk Oblast, Russia. Population:

Geography 
The village is located on the Prutishche River in the basin of the Seym, 73 km from the Russia–Ukraine border, 46 km north-west of Kursk, 21 km north-west of the district center – the town Kurchatov, 1 km from the selsoviet center – Kosteltsevo.

 Climate
Zaprutye has a warm-summer humid continental climate (Dfb in the Köppen climate classification).

Transport 
Zaprutye is located 31 km from the federal route  Crimea Highway, 20 km from the road of regional importance  (Kursk – Lgov – Rylsk – border with Ukraine), 16 km from the road  (Lgov – Konyshyovka), 3 km from the road of intermunicipal significance  (38K-017 – Nikolayevka – Shirkovo), on the road  (38N-362 – Kosteltsevo – Zaprutye), 18 km from the nearest railway station Konyshyovka (railway line Navlya – Lgov-Kiyevsky).

The rural locality is situated 51 km from Kursk Vostochny Airport, 149 km from Belgorod International Airport and 253 km from Voronezh Peter the Great Airport.

References

Notes

Sources

Rural localities in Kurchatovsky District, Kursk Oblast